A permanganate is a chemical compound containing the manganate(VII) ion, the conjugate base of permanganic acid. Because the manganese atom is in the +7 oxidation state, the permanganate(VII) ion is a strong oxidizing agent. The ion is a transition metal oxo complex with tetrahedral geometry. Permanganate solutions are purple in color and are stable in neutral or slightly alkaline media. The exact chemical reaction is dependent upon the organic contaminants present and the oxidant utilized. For example, trichloroethane (C2H3Cl3) is oxidized by permanganate ions to form carbon dioxide (CO2), manganese dioxide (MnO2), hydrogen ions (H+), and chloride ions (Cl−).

8 + 3 → 6 + 8 +  + 4 + 9

In an acidic solution, permanganate(VII) is reduced to the pale pink +2 oxidation state of the manganese(II) (Mn2+) ion.

8  +  + 5 e− → Mn2+ + 4 H2O

In a strongly basic solution, permanganate(VII) is reduced to the green +6 oxidation state of the manganate ion, .

  + e− → 

In a neutral medium, however, it gets reduced to the brown +4 oxidation state of manganese dioxide MnO2.

2 H2O +  + 3 e− → MnO2 + 4 OH−

Production
Permanganates can be produced by oxidation of manganese compounds such as manganese chloride or manganese sulfate by strong oxidizing agents, for instance, sodium hypochlorite or lead dioxide:

2 MnCl2 + 5 NaClO + 6 NaOH → 2 NaMnO4 + 9 NaCl + 3 H2O
2 MnSO4 + 5 PbO2 + 3 H2SO4 → 2 HMnO4 + 5 PbSO4 + 2 H2O

It may also be produced by the disproportionation of manganates, with manganese dioxide as a side-product:

3 Na2MnO4 + 2 H2O → 2 NaMnO4 + MnO2 + 4 NaOH

They are produced commercially by electrolysis or air oxidation of alkaline solutions of manganate salts.

Properties

Permanganates(VII) are salts of permanganic acid. They have a deep purple colour, due to a charge transfer transition from oxo ligand p orbitals to empty orbitals derived from manganese(VII) d orbitals. Permanganate(VII) is a strong oxidizer, and similar to perchlorate. It is therefore in common use in qualitative analysis that involves redox reactions (permanganometry). According to theory, permanganate is strong enough to oxidize water, but this does not actually happen to any extent. Besides this, it is stable.

It is a useful reagent, but it is not very selective with organic compounds. Potassium permanganate is used as a disinfectant and water treatment additive in aquaculture. 

Manganates(VII) are not very stable thermally. For instance, potassium permanganate decomposes at 230 °C to potassium manganate and manganese dioxide, releasing oxygen gas:

2 KMnO4 → K2MnO4 + MnO2 + O2

A permanganate can oxidize an amine to a nitro compound, an alcohol to a ketone, an aldehyde to a carboxylic acid, a terminal alkene to a carboxylic acid, oxalic acid to carbon dioxide, and an alkene to a diol. This list is not exhaustive.

In alkene oxidations one intermediate is a cyclic Mn(V) species:

Compounds
 Ammonium permanganate, NH4MnO4
 Barium permanganate, Ba(MnO4)2
 Calcium permanganate, Ca(MnO4)2
 Potassium permanganate, KMnO4
 Sodium permanganate, NaMnO4
 Silver permanganate, AgMnO4

See also
 Perchlorate, a similar ion with a chlorine(VII) center
 Permanganate index
 Chromate, which is isoelectronic with permanganate
 Pertechnetate

References

 
Oxometallates